The 1970 Baylor Bears football team represented the Baylor University in the 1970 NCAA University Division football season. The Bears offense scored 133 points, while the Bears defense allowed 259 points. In the Battle of the Brazos, the Bears beat Texas A&M by a score of 29–24.

Schedule

Team players drafted into the NFL
The following players were drafted into professional football following the season.

References

Baylor
Baylor Bears football seasons
Baylor Bears football